Ahel (also Romanized as Ahl and Ehel) is a town in Eshkanan District, Lamerd County, Fars Province, Iran.  At the 2006 census, its population was 2,797, in 606 families. At the 2016, its population was 4,300, in 1012 families.

There are documents show that this town back to sasanid or  Neo-Persian Empire of ancient Iran. the Sorez Castle, Water Mill, Qanat and Aqueduct are famous.

References

Populated places in Lamerd County

Cities in Fars Province
Lur people